Abdelhadi Habassa (born 13 January 1976) is a Moroccan long-distance runner.

He finished eighteenth at the 2001 World Half Marathon Championships.

His personal best time in the 10,000 metres was 28:16.28 minutes, achieved in July 2001 in Ottawa. His personal best time in the half marathon was 1:01:21 hours, achieved in April 2003 in Safi.

In 2008 Habassa was found guilty of norandrosterone doping. The sample was delivered on 3 February 2008 in an in-competition test in Valladolid, Spain. He received an IAAF suspension from May 2008 to May 2010.

References

1976 births
Living people
Moroccan male long-distance runners
Doping cases in athletics
Moroccan sportspeople in doping cases
20th-century Moroccan people
21st-century Moroccan people